Edward Alfred Watts (1 August 1912 – 3 May 1982) was an English cricketer. He was born in Peckham, London.

A right-arm fast-medium bowler and a useful right-handed batsman, he played for Surrey from 1933 to 1949. Despite losing some of what might have been his best years to World War II, he took 729 first-class wickets at 26.06, with best innings figures of 10/67 in the second innings against Warwickshire at Edgbaston in 1939. He scored 6158 runs at 21.38, including two centuries. His highest score of 123 was made against a powerful Yorkshire attack at Bradford in 1934. The innings included  four 6s and fourteen 4s and took under two hours, as did his only other century.

He was the brother-in-law of Alf Gover, with whom he often opened the Surrey bowling. After his cricket career, he ran a sports shop. He died in Cheam, Surrey at age 69.

References
Cricinfo profile
Wisden obituary

English cricketers
Surrey cricketers
1912 births
1982 deaths
People from Peckham
Cricketers who have taken ten wickets in an innings
English cricketers of 1919 to 1945
Sir T. E. W. Brinckman's XI cricketers